Franklin/Van Buren was a station on the Chicago Transit Authority's Metropolitan Main Line. The station was located at Franklin Street and Van Buren Street in downtown Chicago. Franklin/Van Buren opened on October 11, 1897, and closed 58 years later on October 11, 1955.

References

Defunct Chicago "L" stations
Railway stations in the United States opened in 1897
Railway stations closed in 1955
1897 establishments in Illinois
1955 disestablishments in Illinois
Former North Shore Line stations